"Games People Play", also known as ""They Just Can't Stop It" The (Games People Play)", is a song recorded by American R&B vocal group The Spinners. Released in 1975 from their Pick of the Litter album, featuring lead vocals by Bobby Smith, it was a crossover success, spending a week at number one on the US Hot Soul Singles chart and peaking at number five on the Billboard Hot 100.  Recorded at Philadelphia's Sigma Sound Studios, the house band MFSB provided the backing.

Female backing vocals on the song were performed by Carla L. Benson, Evette Benton, and Barbara Ingram, who together formed the legendary studio backing vocal group Sweethearts of Sigma. The female lead vocal on the track is by Miss Benton. This song was an RIAA certified million-seller for the Spinners.

Credits
Lead vocals by Bobby Smith, Pervis Jackson, and Evette Benton
Background vocals by Philippé Wynne, Pervis Jackson, Henry Fambrough, Billy Henderson, and the Sweethearts of Sigma: Barbara Ingram, Carla L. Benson and Evette Benton
Instrumentation by various MFSB

Charts

Weekly charts

Year-end charts

References

External links
[ Song review] on Allmusic
Song review at Songfacts
 

1975 singles
The Spinners (American group) songs
1975 songs
Atlantic Records singles